Victor Edmund Jarvis (30 September 1898 – 30 April 1975) was an English cricketer.  Jarvis was a right-handed batsman who bowled slow left-arm orthodox.  He was born at Hampstead, London.

Jarvis made his first-class debut for Essex against Glamorgan in the 1925 County Championship.  In this match, he scored 7 runs in Essex's first-innings before being dismissed by Frank Ryan, while in their second-innings he was dismissed for a duck by the same bowler.  He made a second and final first-class in Essex's following County Championship match against Yorkshire.  He made 37 runs in Essex's first-innings of the match, before being dismissed by Wilfred Rhodes.  In their second-innings, he was dismissed for a duck by Abe Waddington.

He died on 30 April 1975 at Stokenchurch, Buckinghamshire.

References

External links
Victor Jarvis at ESPNcricinfo
Victor Jarvis at CricketArchive

1898 births
1975 deaths
People from Hampstead
Cricketers from Greater London
English cricketers
Essex cricketers